Bob Hewitt and Greer Stevens defeated the defending champions Betty Stöve and Frew McMillan in the final, 7–5, 7–6(9–7) to win the mixed doubles tennis title at the 1979 Wimbledon Championships.

Seeds

  Frew McMillan /  Betty Stöve (final)
  Bob Hewitt /  Greer Stevens (champions)
  Marty Riessen /  Wendy Turnbull (quarterfinals)
  John Newcombe /  Evonne Cawley (semifinals)
  Ion Țiriac /  Virginia Ruzici (third round)
 n/a
  John Lloyd /  Rosie Casals (third round)
   Ross Case /  Betty Ann Stuart (third round, withdrew)

Draw

Finals

Top half

Section 1

Section 2

Bottom half

Section 3

Section 4

References

External links

1979 Wimbledon Championships – Doubles draws and results at the International Tennis Federation

X=Mixed Doubles
Wimbledon Championship by year – Mixed doubles